Benjamin Ethan Lawson (born 12 June 1995) is a British professional basketball player who plays for the Kumamoto Volters of the B.League in Japan. He played college basketball for Western Kentucky. Standing at 7 ft 1 in (2.16 m), Lawson plays the power forward / center positions.

High school career

Oaklands College (2011–13)

Lawson's basketball career began at Oaklands College in St. Albans, England. He averaged 15 points, 11 rebounds, and 4.7 blocks during the 2012-13 season. Shot 45 percent from the floor and 40 percent from three-point range; season highs were 32 points and 21 rebounds.

College career

Western Kentucky (2013–17)

Lawson played for Western Kentucky. As a senior, he averaged 5.3 points and 3.3 rebounds per game. Lawson finished his college career with 185 blocks, ranking fourth on WKU’s all-time list.

Professional career

European University of Lefke (2017–18)

Played his first professional season with the European University of Lefke in the North Cyprus first league. Lawson hit the decisive game winning shot in the playoff series, sending EUL into the Championship final.

Fukuoka Rizing Zephyr (2018–19)

Lawson played his second professional season with Rizing Zephyr Fukuoka in Japan. He appeared in 44 games (43 starts) and averaged 15 points, 10.5 rebounds, 1.9 assists, 1.18 steals, and 1.7 blocks in 34.6 minutes; he shot 49.8 percent from the field and 68.8 percent from the free throw line in the Japanese B.League. Lawson scored in double figures 40 times, including 6 games with at least 20 points; he grabbed double-digit rebounds 21 times and posted 20 double-doubles.

Memphis Grizzlies NBA Summer League (2019)

Lawson competed with the Memphis Grizzlies in the NBA Summer League in Salt Lake City and Las Vegas. Memphis became the NBA Summer League Champions on 15 July 2019. Earning quality minutes in the tournament, Lawson was an integral part of the Grizzlies run to the final.

National team career

In 2013, Lawson and Basketball England played in Latvia for the 2013 FIBA Europe Under-18 Championship. In a valuable and experience-gaining tournament, Lawson and the team finished 9th out of 16th. In a historic overtime game Vs Spain, England were victors 75-66.

The 2014 FIBA Europe Under-20 Championship was hosted by Crete, Greece. After a promising group stage with Great Britain placing 2nd, Lawson sustained a back injury leaving him out of action until the last two remaining games of the tournament. Great Britain finished 11th out of 20.

Italy was the location for the 2015 FIBA Europe Under-20 Championship. The team finished 15th in the tournament; Lawson had a standout game of 11 points and 9 rebounds against Germany.

Personal life

Having been a rugby player from a young age, Lawson realised his body type had become less suited to rugby, and switched to basketball at the age of 15. He transferred over to Oaklands College from Hitchin Boys School at the age of 16 and spent 2011 - 2013 developing his game with the basketball academy and competing in the EABL (Elite Academy Basketball League). In the two years with Oaklands, he went from school to county, to regional, and then was invited to join the national team squads at U18 and U20.

Career statistics

Professional career 
|-
| style="text-align:left;"| 2017-18
| style="text-align:left;"| European University of Lefke*
| 42 || 42 || 28.4 ||.563  ||.327  || .781|| 11.8 || 1.21 ||1.91  ||2.38 || 20.3
|-
| style="text-align:left;"| 2018-19
| style="text-align:left;"| Fukuoka Rizing Zephyr
| 44 || 43 || 34.6 || .498 || .200 || .688|| 10.5 || 1.94  || 1.27 || 1.76 || 15.0
|-
| style="text-align:left;"| 2019
| style="text-align:left;"| Memphis Grizzlies
| 8 || 1 || 14.8 || .412 || .231 || .729|| 5.50 || 0.12  || 0.62 || 0.75 || 6.12

*No official statistics accessible for the 2017-18 season.

National team career 
|-
| style="text-align:left;"| 2012-13
| style="text-align:left;"| Team England U18
| 3 || 2 || 23.3 ||.500  ||1.000  || .750|| 2.7 || 0.3 || 3  || 1.3 || 6.7
|-
| style="text-align:left;"| 2013
| style="text-align:left;"| Team GB U18
| 7 || 7 || 14.2 || .414 || .000 || .500 || 2.1 || 0.1  || 0.4 || 0.3 || 3.6
|-
| style="text-align:left;"| 2014
| style="text-align:left;"| Team GB U20
| 8 || 8 || 19.5 || .400 || .000 || .812|| 4.2 ||0.9  || 0.8 || 1.6 || 5.1
|-
| style="text-align:left;"| 2015
| style="text-align:left;"| Team GB U20
| 9 ||9 || 25.3 || .542 || .000 || .462|| 4.6 ||0.6|| 0.8 ||1.4 ||7.8

College career 
|-
| style="text-align:left;"| 2013-14
| style="text-align:left;"| Western Kentucky
| 12 || 2 || 7.9 ||.471  ||.000  || .667|| 1.50 || 0.17 ||0.08  ||0.75 || 2.00
|-
| style="text-align:left;"| 2014-15
| style="text-align:left;"| Western Kentucky
| 32 || 8 || 18.8 || .583 || .000 || .490|| 3.22 ||0.66  || 0.44 || 1.66 || 3.84
|-
| style="text-align:left;"| 2015-16
| style="text-align:left;"| Western Kentucky
| 34 || 11 || 16.1 || .594 || 1.000 || .767|| 3.29 ||0.38  || 0.32 || 1.91 || 5.03
|-
| style="text-align:left;"| 2016-17
| style="text-align:left;"| Western Kentucky
| 32 ||15 || 15.8 || .569 || .000 || .643|| 3.25 ||0.22 || 0.44 ||1.78 ||5.28
|-
| style=“text-align:left;”| Career
| style=“text-align:left;”| Western Kentucky 
| 110 || 36 || 15.8 || .575 || .200 || .650 || 3.06 || 0.39 || 0.36 || 1.67 || 4.43

References

1995 births
Living people
British expatriate basketball people in the United States
British men's basketball players
Kumamoto Volters players
Rizing Zephyr Fukuoka players
Western Kentucky Hilltoppers basketball players
Centers (basketball)
Sportspeople from Welwyn Garden City
Toyotsu Fighting Eagles Nagoya players
English expatriate sportspeople in the United States
British expatriate basketball people in Japan
English expatriate sportspeople in Japan
English expatriate sportspeople in Northern Cyprus
Expatriate basketball people in Northern Cyprus